Bluford is a village in Jefferson County, Illinois, in the United States. As of the 2010 census the village population was 688, down from 785 at the 2000 census. It is part of the Mount Vernon Micropolitan Statistical Area.

Geography

History
The town of Bluford was named after Bluford "Bluf" Green (1868–1912) when he was a small boy  by his father Wiley Green (1835–1878), who was the local justice of the peace.

An extended story about Bluford by Mrs. Opal H. Wood, follows:

In 1881, before there was a Bluford, construction was started on the Air Line Railroad, later the Southern Railroad. George Evans, Mt. Vernon banker, laid out the town on 40 acres of land bisected by the railroad. In 1882, Rev. Z. H. Byard, a United Brethren preacher, built the first store building and dwelling. Byard also was the first postmaster in Bluford, and the first railroad station agent. Bluford was incorporated in 1925. Dwight Bressler was its first mayor.

Bluford spread on both sides of the railroad. The south section unofficially was called Tilford, and the north, Bluford, both being names of the sons of Minerva (Flint) and Wiley Green. When son Tilford died, all the town became Bluford. No reason was given why the boys should have been so honored.

Demographics

As of the census of 2000, there were 785 people, 283 households, and 223 families residing in the village. The racial makeup of the village was 98.09% White, 0.13% Native American, 0.13% Asian, 1.02% from other races, and 0.64% from two or more races. Hispanic or Latino of any race were 1.15% of the population.

There were 283 households, out of which 40.3% had children under the age of 18 living with them, 61.5% were married couples living together, 12.0% had a female householder with no husband present, and 21.2% were non-families. 16.6% of all households were made up of individuals, and 8.5% had someone living alone who was 65 years of age or older.  The average household size was 2.77 and the average family size was 3.09.

In the village, the population was spread out, with 28.0% under the age of 18, 8.8% from 18 to 24, 28.4% from 25 to 44, 20.9% from 45 to 64, and 13.9% who were 65 years of age or older.  The median age was 35 years. For every 100 females, there were 102.3 males.  For every 100 females age 18 and over, there were 98.9 males.

The median income for a household in the village was $38,250, and the median income for a family was $40,515. Males had a median income of $29,205 versus $16,641 for females. The per capita income for the village was $15,537.  About 8.8% of families and 7.9% of the population were below the poverty line, including 4.7% of those under age 18 and 10.8% of those age 65 or over.

References

Villages in Jefferson County, Illinois
Villages in Illinois
Mount Vernon, Illinois micropolitan area